Kenneth Platts (1946—1989) was a British composer.

He studied composition at the London College of Music with W. R. Pasfield and Lennox Berkeley. He is often classed as a composer of 'light music'. He wrote in an accessible style, and produced many works suitable for children and amateurs. His better-known compositions include a Concerto for Brass Band (?1978), a Sonatina (1979) for guitar, Delta Dances (1980) for wind band and a Divertimento for string orchestra.

1946 births
1989 deaths
20th-century classical composers
British classical composers
British male classical composers
20th-century British composers
20th-century British male musicians
20th-century British musicians